The 2020 Billboard Music Awards were held on Wednesday October 14, 2020, at the Dolby Theatre in Los Angeles, California. The ceremony was broadcast live from NBC. Hosted by Kelly Clarkson for the third year in a row, the ceremony was sponsored by TikTok and Xfinity. The ceremony was originally scheduled for April 29, 2020, but was later postponed first indefinitely and then to October due to the COVID-19 pandemic. Nominees were announced on September 22, 2020. Voting opened on TikTok on October 1 and closed on October 13. Presenters were announced October 13.

Post Malone was the most awarded, with nine awards. Malone was also the most nominated, with 16 nominations. Garth Brooks and Killer Mike received the Icon Award and the inaugural Change Maker Award, respectively.

Background
The 2020 ceremony was originally scheduled to be held April 29, 2020, at the MGM Grand Garden Arena in Las Vegas. Kelly Clarkson was announced as the host. She had previously hosted the 2018 and 2019 ceremonies. On March 17, NBC and Dick Clark Productions issued a joint statement postponing the ceremony due to the COVID-19 pandemic. In the statement, they stated "[in] accordance with the current guidelines set forth by national and local health officials and in order to ensure the health and safety of our artists, fans, guests and staff, [w]e are postponing the Billboard Music Awards." On August 14 of the same year, the show was rescheduled for October 14. On September 22, the nominees for all categories were announced. The first round of performers were announced September 29. Garth Brooks received the Icon Award, as announced on February 26, 2020; succeeding Mariah Carey, who won the award in 2019. Killer Mike received the inaugural Change Maker Award, as announced two days before the ceremony. Voting for fan-voted categories opened on dance video platform TikTok on October 1. TikTok and Xfinity sponsored the ceremony.

Performers 

Notes
  Pre-taped at the P.W. Gillibrand Co. Silver Sand quarry in Simi Valley, California.
  Pre-recorded in Seoul, South Korea.

Winners and nominees
Nominees were announced in a series of Twitter statements on September 22, 2020. Post Malone was the most nominated, with 16 nominations, followed by Lil Nas X with 13, and Khalid and Billie Eilish with 12. Voting for the three fan-voted categories, Billboard Chart Achievement, Top Social Artist and Best Collaboration opened on dance-sharing video app TikTok on October 1, 2020, and closed on October 13.

Winners are first and are in bold.

Presenters
Presenters were announced October 13 in a series of Twitter statements.

Nicole Richie - presented Top Billboard 200 Album
Julia Michaels - presented Top Hot 100 Song
Jharrel Jerome - presented Top Female Artist
Jane Lynch - presented Top Country Artist
Sheila E. - presented Top Song Sales Artist
Keisha Bottoms – presented Change Maker Award
Twitch - presented Top Latin Artist
Lilly Singh - presented Top Male Artist
Cher – presented the Icon Award
Jay Ellis - presented Top R&B Artist
Addison Rae - presented Billboard Chart Achievement
Spencer X - presented Top Social Artist
Garcelle Beauvais - presented Top Christian Artist
Taraji P. Henson - presented Top Artist

References

Billboard Music Award
Billboard awards
2020 music awards
Billboard Music Awards